TCIFA National Academy is a multi-use stadium in Providenciales, Turks and Caicos Islands. It is currently used mostly for football matches. The stadium holds 3,000 and was built in 2004.

References

Football venues in the Turks and Caicos Islands
Turk and Caicos Islands
Buildings and structures in Providenciales
Sports venues completed in 2004
2004 establishments in the Turks and Caicos Islands